Manjural (sometimes Monjural) Islam (born 7 November 1979) is a Bangladeshi cricketer who played in 17 Test matches and 34 One Day Internationals from 1999 to 2004. He is a left-arm seam bowler.

Manjural Islam made his Test debut in April 2001, against Zimbabwe at Bulawayo where he took his best innings figures of 6 for 81. He represented Bangladesh in both the 1999 and the 2003 World Cups.

In 2009 he was one of a number of players who decided to leave Bangladeshi domestic cricket in order to participate in the unsanctioned Indian Cricket League as part of the squad for the new Dhaka Warriors side,
for which he was banned from playing in official cricket matches in Bangladesh for 10 years by the Bangladesh Cricket Board.

In October 2020, he was appointed as the chief selector of the Bangladesh women's cricket team.

See also
 List of Bangladesh cricketers who have taken five-wicket hauls on Test debut

References

External links
 

1979 births
Living people
Bangladesh Test cricketers
Bangladesh One Day International cricketers
Bangladeshi cricketers
Cricketers at the 1999 Cricket World Cup
Cricketers at the 2003 Cricket World Cup
Khulna Division cricketers
Cricketers who have taken five wickets on Test debut
Bangladeshi cricket coaches
ICL Bangladesh XI cricketers
Dhaka Warriors cricketers
Mohammedan Sporting Club cricketers
Victoria Sporting Club cricketers
People from Khulna